All Alone is a 1963 studio album recorded by Jo Stafford and released by Vocalion Records.

Track listing

Side 1
 The One I Love (Belongs to Somebody Else)	 	
 I'll Never Smile Again Until I Smile at You	 	
 Oh! Look at Me Now	 	
 Who Can I Turn to?	 	
 There Are Such Things	 	
 I'll Take Tallulah

Side 2
 Let's Get Away From It All	 	
 It Started All Over Again	 	
 Whatcha Know Joe	 	
 The Night We Called It a Day	 	
 Yes Indeed

References

1963 albums
Jo Stafford albums
Vocalion Records albums